The giant Atlantic tree-rat (Phyllomys thomasi) is a spiny rat species from Brazil. It is endemic to São Sebastião Island off the coast of São Paulo State. The island is largely protected by the Ilhabela State Park.

References

Phyllomys
Taxa named by Hermann von Ihering 
Mammals of Brazil
Endemic fauna of Brazil
Mammals described in 1897